A highly destructive outbreak of 19 tornadoes struck areas from Oklahoma to Indiana. The Oklahoma City metropolitan area took the brunt of the outbreak with 10 F2 or F3 tornadoes touching down in the area alone on April 28, including one F3 tornado that tore directly through Downtown Oklahoma City. The outbreak killed three, injured 79, and caused $3.883 million (1960 USD) in damage.

Confirmed tornadoes

April 28 event

April 29 event

April 30 event

Oklahoma City–Forest Park, Oklahoma

This very destructive, rain-wrapped F3 tornado embedded within a  swath of up to  hail and straight-line winds of nearly  first touched down in the Rancho Village community in Southern Oklahoma City. It skipped northeastward, causing heavy damage to homes, businesses, trees, gardens, shrubs, and power lines in the Heronville, Capitol Hill, and Central Capitol Hill neighborhoods. It briefly paralleled the North Canadian River (now known as the Oklahoma River) before crossing it and tearing through the present-day Boathouse District of southeastern Downtown Oklahoma City, where oil derricks were blown over. The neighborhoods of Carverdale, Edwards Community, Dodson Heights, and Garden Neighborhood Council were then hit as well before the tornado struck Forest Park, Oklahoma. The Rock Manor Estates was heavily damaged before the tornado began to move out of populated areas. It then destroyed some crops before dissipating.

Two homes were destroyed, 40 others were heavily damaged, and 1,500 others had minor damage. There were 57 injuries, only seven of which were minor, with some people only narrowly escaping death. As a whole, the storm itself caused $4 million in damage to the city. This event may have consisted of several small tornadoes or sub-vortices that grazed rooftops.

Non-tornadic impacts
Numerous reports of large hail and destructive straight-line winds were recorded during the three-day outbreak. All three events occurred on April 28.

See also
List of North American tornadoes and tornado outbreaks
1999 Oklahoma tornado outbreak

Notes

References

Tornadoes of 1960
F3 tornadoes
Tornadoes in Oklahoma
Tornadoes in Kansas
Tornadoes in Louisiana
Tornadoes in Illinois
Tornadoes in Indiana